Banbury Mosque is a mosque located in Banbury, Oxfordshire, England. In September 2008, the mosque was given permission to expand its size to allow women to pray separately, however the expansion received some criticism from local residents. In July 2009, Abdul Rahman Al-Sudais, the Imam of the Masjid al-Haram, the holiest mosque of Islam which is located in Mecca, gave a speech in Banbury. The Ash-Shifa School girls' Islamic school is located within the grounds of Banbury Mosque. The mosque was newly rebuilt in 2012 by leading small-medium construction company Civic Construction Limited directed by Mr Wajid Ali.

See also
 List of mosques in Great Britain

References

Mosques in England
Banbury